The 1986 du Maurier Classic was contested from July 24–27 at Board of Trade Country Club. It was the 14th edition of the du Maurier Classic, and the eighth edition as a major championship on the LPGA Tour.

This event was won by Pat Bradley in a sudden-death playoff over Ayako Okamoto with a birdie on the first extra hole.

Final leaderboard

External links
 Golf Observer source

Canadian Women's Open
Sport in Vaughan
du Maurier Classic
du Maurier Classic
du Maurier Classic